Abraham Wolf Lilienthal (13 February 1859, in New York City – 15 March 1928, in New York City) was an American violinist and composer.

The son of Solomon Lilienthal and Louisa Schwarzschild, Lilienthal married Ida C. Salberg in 1885. He is buried at the Linden Hill Jewish Cemetery in Ridgewood, Queens.

Lilienthal was a violinist in the orchestras of Leopold Damrosch and Theodore Thomas and with the New York String Quartet. Much of compositional output was chamber music, but he collaborated on an opera, The Dove of Peace, with Walter Damrosch and Wallace Irving. The sheet music for his Sonata for Cello and Piano, Op. 40 can be seen at IMSLP.

References

External links
 

1859 births
1928 deaths
19th-century American composers
20th-century American composers
American male classical composers
American classical violinists
Male classical violinists
American male violinists
Jewish American classical composers
Musicians from New York City
19th-century American male musicians
20th-century American male musicians